This article contains the rosters of teams that played in the 2014–15 Euroleague basketball tournament.

Notes
All squads as of 22 December 2014.

Real Madrid

Anadolu Efes

Žalgiris

Nizhny Novgorod

UNICS Kazan

Dinamo Sassari

CSKA Moscow

Maccabi Tel Aviv

Unicaja

Alba Berlin

Cedevita Zagreb

Limoges CSP

FC Barcelona

Fenerbahçe Ülker

Panathinaikos

}

}

}

EA7 Emporio Armani Milano

FC Bayern Munich

PGE Turów

Olympiacos

Crvena zvezda

Laboral Kutxa

Galatasaray

Neptūnas

Valencia

squads
Basketball squads